Jason Andrew Diederich is a below-knee amputee Australian Paralympic swimmer.  He participated in the 1988 Seoul Paralympics and won a silver medal at the 1992 Barcelona Paralympics in the Men's 100 m Butterfly S10 event. At the age of 23, in 1994 he completed his first solo Rottnest Channel Swim and has undertaken the swim several times since.

Diederich is an occupational therapist and studied at the Curtin University of Technology. He originally lived in Perth, Western Australia and then moved to Canberra, Australian Capital Territory. In 2013, he  lived in Melbourne, Victoria and was Executive General Manager, Community Care, Australian Home Care.

In 1992, he was Curtin University of Technology Sports person of the year.

References

Male Paralympic swimmers of Australia
Swimmers at the 1988 Summer Paralympics
Swimmers at the 1992 Summer Paralympics
Paralympic silver medalists for Australia
Living people
Medalists at the 1992 Summer Paralympics
Amputee category Paralympic competitors
Curtin University alumni
Occupational therapists
Swimmers from Perth, Western Australia
People educated at Rossmoyne Senior High School
Year of birth missing (living people)
Paralympic medalists in swimming
Australian male butterfly swimmers
Australian male freestyle swimmers
S10-classified Paralympic swimmers
Medalists at the World Para Swimming Championships